The Lavana, Lohana , Lobana , Labana,  are a Hindu caste found in the states of Rajasthan and Gujarat in India.

History and origin

The Lavana are a branch of the larger community of North India. They are descent from the Indo-Scythians, and the word lavana also means salt in Hindi, and the community’s traditional occupation was the merchant  and transportation of salt.

Present circumstances

The Lavana are an endogamous community. They have eleven exogamous clans, namely the Dharawat, Dhogan, Basi, Gundalia, Datnawat, Anderia, Tageria, Kalchana, Baluda, Lakhrond, and Bakrea. All these clans have equal status.

The community is traditionally associated with saltpetre trading, but many are now farmers, agricultural and traders.

See also
Labana

References

People of India - Rajasthan (Set of 2 volumes) Published by Popular Prakashan

Indian castes
Saltmaking castes
Salt industry in India
Social groups of Gujarat
Social groups of Rajasthan